Mike John Thompson (born December 22, 1971) is a former defensive tackle in the National Football League. Thompson was drafted in the fourth round of the 1995 NFL Draft by the Jacksonville Jaguars and played that season with the team. The following season, he was a member of the Cincinnati Bengals, but did not see any playing time during the regular season. After playing the following season with the Bengals he played two more with the Cleveland Browns. He was also a member of the Browns during the 2001 NFL season, but once again did not see any playing time.

References

1971 births
Living people
American football defensive tackles
Cincinnati Bengals players
Cleveland Browns players
Green Bay Packers players
Jacksonville Jaguars players
Wisconsin Badgers football players
People from Portage, Wisconsin
Players of American football from Wisconsin